The Parker Family Saga (also known as the Jean Shepherd's Parker Family Saga franchise, the Ralph Parker franchise, or colloquially the A Christmas Story franchise), is a collection of American family-comedies based upon the stories of author Jean Shepherd. The stories originated on Shepherd's radio programs and in his books before being adapted into a stage play, two theatrical films, four made-for-TV films, one straight-to-home video film, one unaired pilot episode for a planned television series, one musical adaptation, one live television adaptation of that musical and one made-for-streaming movie. 

All of the productions in the saga center around Ralphie Parker, a child in the 1930s and 1940s in suburban Indiana, and his friends and family. Ralphie Parker was loosely based upon Shepherd's childhood. For the rest of his life, Shepherd was the first-person narrator for all productions involving the character. Shepherd publicly claimed that all of his work was entirely fictional, but the names of his own friends and family are in his books.

Origin
The franchise is based on the 1966 American comedic novel In God We Trust: All Others Pay Cash, authored by Jean Shepherd. The book details fictionalized stories from the his childhood. Work began on the novel, after initially writing and releasing short stories in Playboy magazine and broadcasting other stories on radio productions. Released in October 1966, and published by Doubleday and Broadway Books, the release earned a spot on [[The New York Times Best Seller list|The New York Times''' Best Seller list]].Herrmann, Andrew. "Love-Hate Affair With Hometown." Chicago Sun-Times. December 15, 1999. In God We Trust was received positively from critics, for its humor and relatable stories.Dozois, p. xlvii.

The week of Shepherd's death, the novel became Amazon's 142nd best selling novel. The book served as the premise for the franchise, with Shepherd's work incorporated into a series of films, television productions, and stage plays.

Film

The Phantom of the Open Hearth (1976)

Released as a made-for-television film, the movie was met with mixed critical reception. However, it is credited with providing studio interest in the eventual creation of A Christmas Story years later.

A middle-aged Ralph Parker introduces the film, before the events of the movie flashback to the past. Set during the late-1940s to early-1950s America, high school-aged Ralph prepares for the upcoming junior prom. Every day at school he tries to overcome his shyness and ask his crush, a popular classmate named Daphne Bigelow, to the event. At home, Ralph finds himself at odds with his father and his over-involved mother. His parents are busy with their own interests. Mr. Parker once again orders a tasteless lamp from a contest he won in an advertisement, and Mrs. Parker often attends "dish night" at the local movie theater to acquire a collection of dinner dishes. Though Ralph decides to ask his geeky neighbor Wanda Hickey to the dance, he continues to wish he could win the affections of Daphne. Later with his friends and their dates, Ralph drinks alcohol excessively. The group finds themselves sick and vomiting in the bathroom stall, during the eventful night of junior prom.

The Great American Fourth of July and Other Disasters (1982)

Released as a made-for-television film, debuting on American Playhouse, season one, episode ten; the movie was met with moderately positive critical reception. In the years since, the film has been labeled as a 4th of July holiday movie essential.

Set during the late-1940s to early-1950s America, high school-aged Ralph Parker prepares himself for the perceived date of his lifetime, with his friend's attractive cousin named Pamela. While he plans the event with precision, his mother and father each respectively prepare to celebrate the nation's Independence Day. Mrs. Parker passes a chain letter around the neighborhood, while inheriting a large sum of wash rags. Mr. Parker decides to display his patriotism by lighting off Roman Candle fireworks from his pockets that night during the neighborhood event. Though Ralph believes he's prepared for the date, he ultimately embarrasses himself. Meanwhile, the parents come to terms with the neighbors' perceptions of their family.

A Christmas Story (1983)

Released theatrically, to mixed-to mild critical reception and mild box office returns, A Christmas Story has become a Christmas classic.

Set during early-1940s America, a young elementary school aged Ralph "Ralphie" Parker spends much of his time avoiding the persistent bullying at school and dreaming of his ideal Christmas gift, a Red Ryder Range Model air rifle. Seeking to preserve the integrity of his glasses, he continues to evade the school bullies while dealing with childhood events. While Ralphie finds himself frequently in confrontation with his irritable father and comforted by his doting mother, he seeks to convince his parents that he can responsibly handle the gun should Santa Claus bring it to him.

The Star-Crossed Romance of Josephine Cosnowski (1985)

Released as a made-for-television film, debuting on American Playhouse, season four, episode nine; the movie was met with positive critical reception, with praise directed at the script, returning cast, and its Thanksgiving setting.

A fully grown, middle-aged Ralph Parker introduces the film as the character is going to a movie in theaters directed by a Polish director, which reminds him of a memory from his past. Set during the late-1940s to early-1950s America, high school aged Ralph Parker prepares for Thanksgiving celebrations with his family. His father, Mr. Parker decides that he wants to buy a new family vehicle and starts the processes of purchasing a yellow colored Buick, while his younger brother Randy practices for his role as a turkey in school Thanksgiving Day play. As the holiday approaches, a Polish family moves in. With the excitement of new next-door neighbors, Ralph discovers that the daughter is the girl of his dreams. He begins his first serious relationship. The pair soon discover that their courtship may prove more difficult to manage than necessary.

Ollie Hopnoodle's Haven of Bliss (1988)

Released as a made-for-television film, as a collaboration between American Playhouse and Walt Disney Television; the movie was met with mixed-to-positive critical reception.

Set during 1950s America, high school-aged Ralph Parker applies for his first summer break job with his friends. After various applications, the group gets hired to work at Scott's Used Furniture Palace. With plans to save their money, they endure tiring conditions of delivering heavy appliances such as refrigerators up flights of stairs. The work quickly becomes Ralph's source of pain, stress, and nightmares. In the meantime, as the Parkers prepare for their planned vacation, they soon discover that their family dog named Fuzzhead is missing. Though Mr. Parker is unfazed, Mrs. Parker threatens her husband with cancelling their trip if they cannot find the animal. When the pair post poorly drawn posters with a large reward for the return of their pet, countless neighbors appear with various dogs with hopes of earning the prize money. Later, the couple find Fuzzhead riding in the back of Rolls-Royce and pursue the driver until they are able to regain possession of Fuzzhead. Meanwhile, after Ralph is fired from his job, he tells his parents that he quit so that he can join them on their family roadtrip.

Together, the family prepares for the ultimate getaway to Ollie Hopnoodle's Haven of Bliss. Over-packed, the family encounters comedic events along the way. Fully expecting their destination to be a place of relaxation, the family may find more misadventures upon arrival.

It Runs in the Family: My Summer Story (1994)

Released as a limited theatrical film, the movie was met with mixed-to-positive critical reception. Praise was directed to its tone, the plot's pace, use of humor similar to A Christmas Story, and character development. Conversely, criticism was placed on the film's cast.

Set during the summer of 1941, the year following the events of A Christmas Story, Ralph "Ralphie" Parker struggles in his pursuits to avoid the new bully named Scut Farkus. Every day at school, Ralphie attempts to beat Farkus in a game of spinning tops. Despite his repeated attempts at having the last top standing in the chalk circle boundaries, Ralphie continues to be defeated. Meanwhile, Mrs. Parker finds herself at odds with the owner of their local theater over a number of questionable giveaways. When the owner starts a "Dish Night" event, she becomes obsessed with receiving the entire collection of celebrity dishware being handed out. She however begins to call into question the owner's ethics, and gets the town's housewives on her side in the process. Mr. Parker finds himself teaching Ralphie how to fish, much to Randy's jealousy, all while feeling in competition with his country neighbors, the Bumpus family. Frustrated with their persistent boisterous music, their bloodhound dog, and their recently installed outhouse which he is certain is a municipal violation, Mr. Parker seeks to rid their town of the Bumpuses.

A Christmas Story 2 (2012)

Released as a straight-to-DVD film and as direct sequel to the original film (while ignoring My Summer Story from 1994), the film was met with a mostly-negative reception. While the movie was given praise for attempts to portray 1940s-era America, criticisms were directed at reliance on slapstick humor and its inferior derivation of the 1983 film.

Set during 1946 American Christmastime, teenaged 15-year-old Ralph "Ralphie" Parker repeatedly tells his parents that all he wants for Christmas is a 1939 Mercury Eight convertible, which he secretly hopes will help him win the courtship of the classmate he has been crushing on named Drucilla Gootrad. When he attempts to test drive the vehicle at a local used car dealership, he unintentionally causes the car to back off of a display ramp, tapping into a lightpost, and tearing the convertible roof due to a plastic reindeer falling through it. Afraid that his father is going to find out, Ralph attains a job at Higbee's with his best friends to earn the necessary funds to pay the owner for the damages. The group quickly gets reassigned to various departments within the store, before getting into a fight amongst each other and with the store Santa Claus; culminating in getting fired from their positions. Ralphie pleads for his job and convinces the store to rehire him. As Christmas arrives, he discovers that he is one dollar short but attains the needed banknote from one of his friends. On his way to pay the dealership owner for the damages sustained to the Mercury, decides to donate a sum of the money to a less fortunate family. Convinced that he is going to jail, Ralphie is surprised by a series perceived Christmas miracles: the owner lets him go without any legal action, he receives the car he wanted from his parents after all, and additionally gets a girlfriend in the form of the girl he has been infatuated with.

A Christmas Story Christmas (2022)

Another sequel to A Christmas Story was revealed to be in production. Clay Kaytis will serve as director, with a script written by Nick Schenk (who will also serve as executive producer). Peter Billingsley will reprise his role as Ralph "Ralphie" Parker, while the plot will be set during the 1970s with the now-grown character returning to his childhood home with his family for Christmas, following the recent death of his father (aka The Old Man). The cast will feature the character's childhood friends, while Julie Hagerty was cast as Mrs. Parker, his mother, in a role originated by Melinda Dillon (who retired from acting in 2007) in the original film. The casting was revealed in February 2022; Ian Petrella, Scott Schwartz, R. D. Robb, and Zack Ward were cast to reprise their roles as: Randy Parker, Flick, Schwartz, and Scut Farkus, respectively. That same month, Erinn Hayes, River Drosche, and Julianna Layne joined the cast as Ralphie's wife and his kids. Creatives state that the tone will be same real-life style of the original. Billingsley will produce the film with Vince Vaughn. The project will be a joint-venture production between Legendary Pictures, Warner Bros. Pictures, Wild West Picture Show Productions, and HBO Max Original Films. Principal photography commenced at the end of February, in the Republic of Bulgaria and Hungary. The film will be dedicated to the memory of Darren McGavin (who played Ralphie's Old Man in the original film), who died on February 25, 2006, at the age of 83. The first teaser trailer, with the release date was released in October 2022.

The film was released in the United States via streaming on November 17, 2022, on HBO Max by Warner Bros. Discovery Global Streaming & Interactive Entertainment.

Television
Unaired television pilotThe Phantom of the Open Hearth was reshot, reimagined and planned to serve as the pilot episode for an ongoing television series with an intended release in 1978. Though the finished product never aired, production was completed. The production was directed by John Rich, with a script by Jean Shepherd, cinematography by Roland 'Ozzie' Smith, and editing from Dick Bartlett. Filmed with a production title the same as the 1976 film, the cast included John Shepherd, Richard Venture, Barbara Bolton, and Jean Shepherd as young Ralph "Ralphie" Parker, Mr. Parker, Mrs. Parker, and Ralph Parker/the Narrator, respectively. The series' inaugural episode notedly included the original introduction of the now-famous line: "Oh, fudge (but I didn't say 'fudge')!" which was later introduced in A Christmas Story.

A Christmas Story: Live! (2017)

Produced as a live television special, the release was met with mixed-to-negative at best critical reception in favor of the original film. Critiques were directed at the tone, the running time, the Broadway musical numbers and the perceived usage of "cutesyness".

In May 2017, a live telecast adaptation of the musical play, was announced to be in development. Scott Ellis and Alex Rudzinski were hired as co-directors, with a telescript co-written by Robert Cary and Jonathan Tolins. Benj Pasek and Justin Paul, who wrote the original Broadway, collaborated to write additional lyrics and music for additional songs in the three-hour long special. Tolins and Cary co-wrote the accompanying novelization. The project was a joint-venture production between Fox Television, and Warner Horizon Unscripted & Alternative Television. Marc Platt served as producer. A nationwide open casting call was made in order to find a child actor to cast in the role of Ralph "Ralphie" Parker.

Stage
Play
Prior to the release of A Christmas Story, Bob Clark and Jean Shepherd wrote the first draft for the script. This first draft had a working title that was the same as Shepherd's original play, In God We Trust. The film script was based on the play, which in turn was also based on the similarly named novel.

Musical

The musical theater adaptation of A Christmas Story, released in December 2009 at Kansas City Repertory Theatre in Missouri, as a pre-Broadway engagement with music and lyrics by Scott Davenport Richards. Directed by Eric Rosen, with a playscript, libretto, and novelization by Joseph Robinette; the play released with a warm reception from critics. Following the initial release however, Richards departed the production. Benj Pasek and Justin Paul were hired to rewrite the score and lyrics for the relaunch of the musical which debuted in December 2010. The musical adaptation was produced by Gerald Goehring, Michael F. Mitri, Robert G. Bartner, and Michael A. Jenkins as a Bartner/Jenkins Entertainment stage production. The reimagined musical was met with critical acclaim, and was a financial success on Broadway.

Main cast and characters

 

Additional crew and production details

Reception

Box office and financial performance

Critical and public response

Notes

References

Bibliography

 Bergmann, Eugene B. Excelsior, You Fathead!: The Art and Enigma of Jean Shepherd. New York: Applause Theatre & Cinema Books, 2005. 
 Dozois, Gardner R., ed. The Year's Best Science Fiction: Nineteenth Annual Collection.'' New York: St. Martin's Griffin, 2002. 

American film series